Tyrell Joseph Richards (born October 7, 1998) is a gridiron football linebacker for the Montreal Alouettes of the Canadian Football League (CFL). He was drafted first overall by the Alouettes in the 2022 CFL Draft.

College career
After using a redshirt year in 2017, Richards played college football for the Syracuse Orange from 2018 to 2020. He entered the transfer portal with the intention of moving to a different school, but was unable due to non-transferable school credits. He did not play in 2021 and instead trained and coached at his high school, Clarkson Secondary School.

Professional career
Richards was ranked as the third best player in the Canadian Football League's Amateur Scouting Bureau final rankings for players eligible in the 2022 CFL Draft. He was then drafted with the first overall pick in the draft after the Montreal Alouettes traded up in order to select him. On May 13, 2022, it was announced that Richards had signed his rookie contract with the Alouettes.

Personal life
Richards was born in Ottawa, Ontario to parents Anik and Nick Richards. He has two sisters and he grew up in Brampton, Ontario.

References

External links
 Montreal Alouettes bio
 Syracuse bio

1998 births
Living people
American football linebackers
Canadian football linebackers
Canadian players of American football
Montreal Alouettes players
Players of Canadian football from Ontario
Canadian football people from Ottawa
Syracuse Orange football players
Sportspeople from Brampton